Hilpoltstein is a town in the district of Roth, in Bavaria, Germany. It is situated 10 km southeast of Roth bei Nürnberg and 30 km south of Nuremberg, close to the lake 'Rothsee.

History
 Origins of the castle and the town date back to the 10th century.
 Town privileges were granted in 1354.
 1799, Hilpoltstein becomes part of Bavaria

Sights
 Rathaus (Town Hall)
 Accessible Tower of the Remains of the early medieval Castle
 Remains of The Town Wall
 Church of Saint John the Baptist (Town's Parish Church)
 Jahrsdorfer House
 Guest House 'Schwarzes Ross' with historic Brewery and museum on handcrafts and town history

Sons and daughters of the place

 Johann Christoph Sturm (1635–1703), astronomer and mathematician
 Friedrich Eibner (1825–1877), painter

People who work or have worked on the ground

 Ludwig Elsbett (1913–2003), engineer and inventor of the Elsbett engine

Annual Events
 Spring Concert of the town's brass band (April)
 Medieval festival with knights tournament (May)
 Challenge Roth: World's largest long-distance triathlon (July)
 Burgfest - Popular folk fair with medieval pageant, flea market in the old town, beer tent, fireworks  (1st weekend of August)
 Kite festival (last weekend of September)
 Christmas Market (1st weekend of the Advent)

References

External links
 Official site 

Roth (district)